Boldești may refer to several places in Romania:

Villages

 Boldești, a village in Avram Iancu Commune, Alba County
 Boldești, a village in Hărmănești Commune, Iași County
 Boldești, a village in Boldești-Grădiștea Commune, Prahova County

Boroughs
 Boldești, a borough in Boldești-Scăeni, Prahova County